Jan or Ján Mucha is the name of:

Jan Mucha (speedway rider) (1941–2014), Polish speedway rider
Ján Mucha (footballer, born 1978), Slovak footballer
Ján Mucha (ice hockey) (born 1984), Slovak ice hockey defenceman
Ján Mucha (born 1982), Slovak football goalkeeper

See also 
Mucha, surname page